Arrien is a commune in the Pyrénées-Atlantiques department in the Nouvelle-Aquitaine region of south-western France.

Geography
Arrien is located some 18 km east by north-east of Pau and 5 km west of Séron. Access to the commune is by road D42 from Sedzère in the north passing through the heart of the commune east of the village and continuing south to Eslourenties-Daban. The D145 also comes from Baleix in the north and joins the D42 in the commune then continues south-west to Lourenties. Access to the village (Town Hall) is by the Chemin de l'Eglise going west from the D42 and by other local roads. Apart from some patches of forest on the western border the commune is entirely farmland.

The Canne stream forms the southern border of the commune joining the Gabas at the south-western corner which in turn forms most of the western border of the commune flowing north-west then north eventually joining the Adour near Toulouzette. The Poundets stream forms the eastern border of the commune and flows north to join the Petit Lees near Lombia.

Places and Hamlets

 Canton
 Cazaux
 Claria
 La Croix d'Arrien
 Fontaine Saint-Jean
 Peret
 La Picharotte
 Poulot
 Pouygarou
 Sarthou

Neighbouring communes and villages

Toponymy
Its name in béarnais is Arrien.

Michel Grosclaude indicated that the origin of the name is obscure and mentioned the possibility of the name of a former owner Ariee.

The following table details the origins of the commune name.

Sources:
Raymond: Topographic Dictionary of the Department of Basses-Pyrenees, 1863, on the page numbers indicated in the table. 
Cassini: Cassini Map from 1750
Ldh/EHESS/Cassini: 

Origins:
Census: Census of Béarn
Eslourenties: Census of Eslourenties
Empire: Archives of the Empire, K 779, No. 12

History
Paul Raymond noted that the commune had a Lay Abbey, vassal of the Viscounts of Béarn. In 1385 Arrien had 5 fires and depended on the bailiwick of Pau. The church depended on the Abbey of Saint-Sigismund at Orthez.

The Saint-Jean fountain is known for its healing powers of varicose ulcers and eye diseases and has attracted many pilgrims since the 12th century.

The commune was part of the Archdeaconry of Vic-Bilh, which depended on the Bishop of Lescar. Lembeye was the chief town.

Administration

List of Successive Mayors

Inter-communality
The commune is part of four inter-communal structures:
 the Communauté de communes du Nord-Est Béarn;
 the AEP association of Luy and Gabas;
 the Energy association of Pyrénées-Atlantiques;
 the inter-communal association for the construction of the Soumoulou rescue centre;

Demography
In 2017 the commune had 185 inhabitants.

Culture and Heritage

Civil Heritage
There are two registrations of historical monuments for Arrien:
Houses and Farms
The former Chateau of Arrien (19th century).. The original chateau was sold in 1730 and converted to a presbytery. The building was sold by the commune in 1975. It is shown on the Cassini Map as a "chateau".

Religious Heritage
The Parish Church of Saint John the Baptist (19th century) is registered as an historical monument. The church contains several items that are registered as historical objects:
The Furniture in the Church
A Sunburst Monstrance (19th century)
A Processional Cross (17th century)
A Processional banner (19th century)

Church Picture Gallery

See also
Communes of the Pyrénées-Atlantiques department

References

External links
Arrien on the 1750 Cassini Map

Communes of Pyrénées-Atlantiques